Rubus pugnax is a North American species of highbush blackberry in section Alleghenienses of the genus Rubus, a member of the rose family. It is found in eastern and central Canada (Québec, Ontario, New Brunswick, Nova Scotia) and in the eastern United States (Maine, Vermont, Massachusetts, New York, Pennsylvania, North Carolina, West Virginia).

References

pugnax
Plants described in 1944
Flora of Canada
Flora of the Eastern United States